The UNTV Cup Season 7 was the 2018–2019 season of the annual charity basketball league in the Philippines, UNTV Cup. The tournament is organized by UNTV under the UNTV-37 Foundation, Inc., thru its chairman and chief executive officer of BMPI-UNTV, "Mr. Public Service" Kuya Daniel Razon.

The season officially opened on September 3, 2018 at the Smart Araneta Coliseum in Cubao, Quezon City. Regular games are held at the Pasig City Sports Center in Pasig with a live telecast on the UNTV Public Service channel every Sunday afternoon. Twelve teams are competing for the championship title this season, lower from a record-high of 14 teams last Season 6.

The best-of-three finals series was held on March 3 and 11, 2019, at the Pasig City Sports Center in Pasig and Smart Araneta Coliseum in Cubao, Quezon City, respectively. The championship is between the two-time champion AFP Cavaliers and defending champion Senate Defenders. AFP swept the series against Senate in two games, 2–0, to get their record third title.

A total of 10 million pesos tax-free was given to the teams' chosen beneficiaries, with the champion team AFP Cavaliers taking home a trophy, and 4 million pesos given to their chosen charity institution.

Teams 
Twelve squads are vying for the championship title of the season, lower from a record-high of 14 teams the previous season. There are 11 returning teams, including all 4 former tournament winners, led by the Season 6 defending champions Senate Defenders.

New Teams 
 Philippine International Trading Corporation (PITC) Global Traders

Returning Teams 
 Philippine Health Insurance Corporation (PhilHealth) Plus – played 2 seasons on Season 1 and Season 2 as the PhilHealth Advocates

Defunct Teams 
 Bureau of Fire Protection (BFP) Firefighters – played 4 seasons from Season 3 to Season 6
 Commission on Audit (COA) Enablers – played 1 season on Season 6
 Department of Health (DOH) Health Achievers – played 1 season on Season 6
 Philippine Drug Enforcement Agency (PDEA) Drug Busters – played 1 season on Season 6

Group A

Group B

Elimination round 

The elimination round began on September 3, 2018 at the Smart Araneta Coliseum in Cubao, Quezon City. As part of tradition, the defending champion is to face another team on opening day based on drawing lots. The draw was performed by UNTV Cup innovator Daniel Razon. In the first game of the season, the defending champion Senate Defenders got a come-from-behind win against the debuting team PITC Global Traders, 73–70. The game featured Senator Manny Pacquiao's tournament debut as a player for Senate, in which he scored 14 points.

First round

Group A

Group B

Second round

Playoffs

Quarterfinals 
The playoffs began on January 13, 2019 at the Pasig City Sports Center in Pasig. 
 Starting this season, the second round standings and results carry over to the quarterfinals. A single round robin format is followed in which all quarterfinals teams face each other once, for a total of 3 games per team. After the round robin, the two bottom teams are eliminated, and will receive ₱100,000 for their chosen beneficiary. The top two teams advance to the semifinal round, and are re-seeded as #3 and #4. On the semifinals, the #1 and #2 teams will play against the #4 and #3 seed, respectively.
 For the first six seasons, the league has used a knockout tournament where the #3 team faces #6, while the #4 seed battles #5. The higher seeded teams have a twice-to-beat advantage, and the winners of both series advance to the semifinals.

Malacañang-PSC Kamao vs. NHA Builders

Senate Defenders vs. PITC Global Traders

PITC Global Traders vs. Malacañang-PSC Kamao

NHA Builders vs. Senate Defenders

NHA Builders vs. PITC Global Traders

Senate Defenders vs. Malacañang-PSC Kamao

Semifinals

(1) AFP Cavaliers vs. (4) NHA Builders

(2) PNP Responders vs. (3) Senate Defenders

3x3 Tournament 
On March 11, 2019, the first 3x3 tournament in the history of the league served as opener for the Game 2 of the Season 7 Finals.  PITC Global Traders were crowned champions by defeating Malacanang-PSC Kamao in the final, taking home ₱20,000 prize.

Teams 
The four non-finals playoff teams participated in the knockout games.
 Malacañang-PSC Kamao
 NHA Builders
 PITC Global Traders
 PNP Responders

Bracket

Results

Battle for Third Place: (2) PNP Responders vs. (4) NHA Builders 
The battle for third place will be between five-time semifinalist PNP Responders and three-time semifinalist NHA Builders, after they lost their semifinals series on separate opponents. NHA won the game, 73–70, and got ₱1,000,000 for their chosen beneficiary as third placer. Despite the loss, PNP received ₱500,000 for charity as fourth placer.

UNTV Cup Finals: (1) AFP Cavaliers vs. (3) Senate Defenders 
The best-of-three finals series will be held on March 3 and 11, 2019 (March 18 if necessary), at the Pasig City Sports Center in Pasig and Smart Araneta Coliseum in Cubao, Quezon City, respectively. The championship is between the two-time champion and #1 team AFP Cavaliers and defending champion Senate Defenders. AFP won their semis matchup versus NHA in two games, while Senate beat PNP in three games with a twice-to-win disadvantage. AFP swept the finals series against Senate, 2–0, to get their record third title and donate ₱4 million to their chosen charity. Despite the loss, Senate received ₱2 million for charity as runner-up.

Winners and Beneficiaries 

A total of 10 million pesos tax-free was given to the teams' chosen beneficiaries, with the champion team AFP Cavaliers taking home a trophy, and 4 million pesos given to their chosen charity institution. The runner-up team Senate Defenders received 2 million pesos for their beneficiary. One million pesos was given to the third place team NHA Builders for their chosen beneficiary, while five hundred thousand pesos was given to the fourth-place finishers PNP Responders' chosen charity. The other participating teams got 100 thousand pesos for their beneficiary.

Individual awards

Season awards

The season's individual awards were given before the start of the Game 2 of the Finals, on March 11, 2019 at the Smart Araneta Coliseum.

Scoring Champion: Ollan Omiping (PNP Responders)
Step Up Player of the Year: Wilfredo Casulla Jr. (AFP Cavaliers)
Defensive Player of the Year: Jeffry Sanders (Senate Defenders)
First Five:
 Chester Tolomia (Judiciary Magis)
 Ollan Omiping (PNP Responders)
 Rod William Vasallo (PITC Global Traders)
 Jeffry Sanders (Senate Defenders)
 Marvin Mercado (NHA Builders)
Most Valuable Player:
Season MVP: Jeffry Sanders (Senate Defenders)
Finals MVP: Jerry Lumongsod (AFP Cavaliers)

Players of the Week
The following players were named the Players of the Week.

Cumulative standings

Elimination rounds

Playoffs

UNTV Cup Segments

Heart of a Champion
The Heart of a Champion segment features UNTV Cup players and their lives off the court as public servants.

Top Plays
The following segment features the top plays of the week and elimination round.

Player, Analyst and Fan Interviews
UNTV Cup players, analysts, and fans share their thoughts in interviews.

See also 
 UNTV Cup
 UNTV Public Service

References

External links 
 UNTV website
 UNTV Cup website

Members Church of God International
2018 Philippine television series debuts
2018 in Philippine sport
2019 in Philippine sport
UNTV Cup
UNTV (Philippines) original programming
2018–19 in Philippine basketball
2018–19 in Philippine basketball leagues